Dr. Jart+ (Hangul: 닥터자르트; read simply as Doctor Jart) is a South Korean skin care brand. It was created in 2004 by entrepreneur Lee Jin-wook, with consultation from dermatologist Dr. Jung Sung-jae. Their name is an abbreviation of "Doctor Joins Art."

History 
In 2003, entrepreneur Lee Jin-wook began to research a product called BB cream. Dr. Jung Sung-jae had been working out of his own Seoul practice since 2001, where he was testing new treatments for patients with severe skin issues. Lee approached Jung to invest and consult with Dr. Jart+, with the intent to bring Jung's formulations to a wider audience. The name "Jart" was initially coined as a portmanteau of "Jung" and "art". Jung remains as the brand's chief dermatologist.

Dr. Jart+ was in development for three years before being exclusively introduced to dermatological clinics. It was officially launched in December 2004. Dr. Jart+ was first sold through e-commerce. Its revenue in 2005 amounted to 500 million won, but began to increase through word-of-mouth on online retailer SkinRx Lab. By 2008, sales amounted to seven billion dollars.

In its early days, Lee focused mostly on exporting Dr. Jart+ outside of Asia, strategizing that the brand's popularity in Asian territories would follow after pioneering more "difficult" markets first. The brand partnered with Japanese department store Takashimaya in June 2009 to offer its products at its now-defunct Fifth Avenue location, which effectively made Dr. Jart+ the first Korean brand since Amorepacific to have a presence in New York. It entered the American market in early 2011 with cosmetics retailer Sephora, offering two BB creams at ten of its locations at the time. The New York Times credited this launch as "[paving] the way for a Korean beauty invasion of the United States." The brand has since expanded to selling 50 products at all Sephora outlets.

Products 

Dr. Jart+ is composed of nine lines, each focused on a specific ingredient or skin issue:

 Cicapair — utilizes tiger grass (centella asiatica) to "[calm] redness and [soothe] irritation"
 Ceramidin — 5-Cera Complex (ceramides) to "restore and repair the skin barrier"
 Water Fuse — Aqua Mineral Complex (minerals) to impart skin hydration
 BB Cream — “beauty balm”  
 Dermaclear — Hydrogen Bio Water (micellar solution) to cleanse, exfoliate skin
 Water Drop — hyaluronic acid; features a "unique emulsion system" that "bursts into tiny water droplets."
 Peptidin — 8-Peptide Complex (peptides)
 Focuspot — patches composed of "micro tips" to target specific conditions
 V7 — V7 Multi-Vitamin Complex (vitamin B3, C, F, K3, B5, E, and H)
 Cryo Rubber — with patented technology to moisturize and intensely soothe

Corporate affairs

Identity 
Dr. Jart+ eschews celebrity endorsements in favor of animation to communicate their brand. Dr. Jart+ 's branding and packaging was refreshed by design firm Pentagram in 2018, starting with the international roll out of their newly created Ceramidin line.

Dr. Jart+ is considered to be among the forefront of brands leading the Korean beauty wave. In an article for Racked, Ju Rhyu, a business-to-business consultant, believes that Dr. Jart+ is keen to "downplay" this angle, like competitors Amorepacific and Belif. These companies communicate a "very clear brand identity and the K-beauty message is more secondary," in an effort to secure brand loyalty and longevity. In an email by Dr. Jart+ 's vice president of marketing, Susan Tsui, they state that the brand is "proud of its Korean roots", yet "Dr. Jart+ is fueled by our commitment to adhere to what we were founded on, art and skincare."

Advertising 
Dr. Jart+ has been the exclusive skin care sponsor of designer brand Opening Ceremony at New York Fashion Week since 2015. The brand has stocked their products in their retail stores since 2011.

References 

South Korean companies established in 2004
2004 establishments in South Korea
Products introduced in 2004
Cosmetics brands of South Korea
Skin care brands
Personal care brands
South Korean brands
Estée Lauder Companies